The hypothalamic–pituitary–prolactin axis (HPP axis), also known as the hypothalamic–pituitary–mammary axis or hypothalamic–pituitary–breast axis, is a hypothalamic–pituitary axis which includes the secretion of prolactin (PRL; luteotropin) from the lactotrophs of the pituitary gland into the circulation and the subsequent action of prolactin on tissues such as, particularly, the mammary glands or breasts. It is involved in lobuloalveolar maturation of the mammary glands during pregnancy and the induction and maintenance of lactation following parturition. Hormones that control the secretion of prolactin from the pituitary gland include dopamine ("prolactin-inhibiting factor", or "PIF"), estradiol, progesterone, thyrotropin-releasing hormone (TRH), and vasoactive intestinal peptide (VIP).

See also
 Prolactin modulator
 Hyperprolactinemia
 Hypoprolactinemia

References

Breastfeeding
Hormones of the hypothalamic-pituitary-prolactin axis
Neuroendocrinology